Omar Jesús Riquelme Plaza (born 18 April 1985) is a Chilean former footballer.

He played at Unión Española.

Honours
Unión Española
 Primera División de Chile (1): 2005 Apertura

Post-retirement
He has performed as a football agent along with his former Brazilian fellow footballer Vandinho and also had football academies. Next, he emigrated to the United States, where he works as a painter in New York.

References

External links
 
 

1985 births
Living people
Footballers from Santiago
Chilean footballers
Unión Española footballers
Deportes Copiapó footballers
C.D. Antofagasta footballers
A.C. Barnechea footballers
Coquimbo Unido footballers
Chilean Primera División players
Primera B de Chile players
Association football fullbacks
Chilean expatriates in the United States